Bayano may refer to:
Bayano, leader of a slave revolt in Panama 
Bayano, Los Santos, corregimiento in Panama
Bayano River, river in Panama
Bayano Lake, lake in Panama
HMS Bayano (1913), banana boat